"Raleigh Was Right" is a poem by William Carlos Williams, composed in response to the Elizabethan exchange between Christopher Marlowe, in "The Passionate Shepherd to His Love", and Walter Raleigh, with "The Nymph's Reply".

Horton Foote's Roots in a Parched Ground, the opening play of The Orphans' Home Cycle, takes its title from a line in this poem.

Text 
Raleigh was right

We cannot go to the country
for the country will bring us
no peace
What can the small violets
tell us that grow on furry stems
in the long grass among
lance-shaped leaves?

Though you praise us
and call to mind the poets
who sung of our loveliness it was
long ago!
long ago!
when country people 
would plow and sow with
flowering minds and pockets
at ease—if ever this were true.

Not now. Love itself a flower
with roots in a parched ground.
Empty pockets
make empty heads. Cure it
if you can but do not believe
that we can live today
in the country
for the country will bring us
no peace.

— William Carlos Williams

References

Christopher Marlowe
Cultural depictions of Walter Raleigh
Poetry by William Carlos Williams